Bloom Festival is Ireland's largest gardening show. It is a large five-day event, held each year in Phoenix Park, Dublin. It was first held in 2007, and is organised by Bord Bia (The Irish Food Board).

The 2020 event was cancelled owing to the measures taken to address the 2020 coronavirus pandemic.

History
The first Bloom garden festival was held in June 2007 and opened by then President of Ireland Mary McAleese. Since its launch, the show has been run by Louise Mc Loughlin, assisted by Gareth Buckley and Gary Graham (Food Board).

The fourth (2010) festival was opened on 3 June 2010, with around 8,000 people visiting during the opening day. Chinese ambassador Liu Biwei and the Earl of Rosse were among notable attendees. Former Chelsea Flower Show judge Andrew Wilson also judged at the event. The 2010 event featured 24 gardens spread across  of Phoenix Park. The winner of Super Garden, an RTÉ competition, was among them.

Past events have featured professional gardeners, an artisan food market and culinary displays from several celebrity chefs. Since the event was launched, the show has had an increasing focus on food, with garden designers finding it hard to get sponsorship, and the food board Bord Bia, pushing its food agenda.

The event has historically attracted large volumes of visitors, increasing from 60,000 people as of the 2010 festival,  to approaching 120,000 people by the time of the 2019 event. The volume of visitors has led to long queues, and increased levels of traffic in the area. The event organisers have sought to encourage attendees to make use of public transport.

Gallery

References

External links
Bloom Festival official site

Annual events in Ireland
Gardening in the Republic of Ireland
Horticultural exhibitions
Flora of Ireland
Recurring events established in 2007
Tourist attractions in Dublin (city)